Corey Jackson (born 1982) is an American politician currently serving in the California State Assembly. A member of the Democratic Party, he represents California's 60th State Assembly district, which includes the northwestern corner of Riverside County and is anchored by the city of Corona. He is the first openly gay black man in the history of the California Legislature, and the first black person to represent Riverside County.

Education 
Jackson was a student member of the California State University Board of Trustees. He received his Master and Doctor of Social Work degrees from California Baptist University.

Political career 
In 2020, Corey Jackson was elected to the Riverside County Board of Education.

In the 2022 California State Assembly election, Jackson defeated Republican Hector Diaz-Nava.

References

External links 

 
 Campaign website

Living people
Democratic Party members of the California State Assembly
LGBT state legislators in California
African-American state legislators in California
21st-century African-American politicians
California Baptist University alumni
1982 births